The public opinion brigades is a state-sponsored web brigade of the Communist Party of Vietnam or linked to the Communist Government of Vietnam.

Similar to Russia's web brigades and China's 50 Cent Army, participants report that they are organized into teams and groups of commentators that participate in Vietnamese and international political blogs and Internet forums using sockpuppets and large-scale orchestrated trolling and disinformation campaigns to promote pro-Vietnamese communist propaganda.

Background
It is unclear how the brigades started since the Communist Party of Vietnam (CPVN) often controls political information. However, the earliest form of Internet propaganda supporting CPVN seems to have begun in 2007, when the Government announced to "eliminate any wrong news that threaten the Party's rule". As the Communist Party is the only party allowed by Vietnamese constitution, it was the beginning of the brigades.
In 2017, Lieutenant-General Nguyen Trong Nghia, deputy head of the Vietnamese military's political department, confirmed that Vietnam has a new, 10,000-strong military cyber warfare unit to counter criticisms of the government on the Internet. The cyber unit named Force 47 is active in several sectors.

Force 47
Force 47 is a large cyberspace military unit of Vietnam revealed in December 2017 with a focus on combating "wrong views" on the Internet. Internet security firms such as Volexity and FireEye report pro-Hanoi or Hanoi regime-sponsored hackers installed spyware on anti-government, dissident websites to track who visits them.

Methods
The methods used are not always clear, but includes criticism of opposing views to those of the Communist Party.  Vietnamese nationalists, dissidents and anti-communists claim that the CPVN has been doing this for a long time, to brainwash people's minds and distort and truth, branding who disagree with the Communist Party as "traitors of the nation".

BBC and Deutsche Welle correspondents have also reported about the brigades' activities.  Other Governments also accused Vietnamese Communist Party's troll army for attacking and hacking websites that criticize the CPVN.

Claims of distortion of history 
There are claims that the CPVN has attempted to rewrite history, including war crimes by North Vietnam during Vietnam War having been completely erased to serve the Party's agenda, promoting only themselves as the "heroes" of Vietnam.

See also
 Astroturfing
 Black propaganda
 Cyberwarfare in Russia
 Fake news website
 Hasbara
 Information warfare
 Internet activism
 Internet police
 PLA Unit 61398, Chinese PLA online hacking & malware implantation unit
 State-sponsored Internet propaganda in other countries:
 Internet Water Army; 50 Cent Party; 50 Cent Army, Chinese communist government's version of Dư luận viên
 Operation Earnest Voice
 Trolls from Olgino
 Web brigades
 Jewish Internet Defense Force
 AK Trolls
 Information security
 Vatnik (slang)

References

Internet manipulation and propaganda
Psychological warfare
Politics of Vietnam
Internet governance
Internet trolling